Pandit Deendayal Upadhyay Government Medical College, located in Rajkot city of Gujarat state, India, is one of a few handful government run medical colleges of the state, working in association with the Pandit Deendayal Upadhyay Government Medical Hospital, situated in the same arena. Located at "Hospital Chowk", that is the government hospital cross lanes, it lies at the entrance of the city. Pandit Dindayal Upadhyay Medical College, Rajkot was started in June 1995.

The college deals with undergraduate and postgraduate courses in the medical profession. The four and half year undergraduate course for the degree of MBBS (Bachelor of Medicine and Bachelor of Surgery) includes batches of 150 students. It now admits 150 (100 recognised and 50 permitted) students per year and is the fastest growing medical college of Gujarat with the target of providing sub speciality education in 15 branches of Medicine & Surgery. It is affiliated to Saurashtra University, Rajkot. The postgraduate course for the degrees of M.S. (Master of Surgery) and M.D. (Doctor of Medicine) involves variable number of seats as according to the department of specialty concerned.

External links
 http://gujhealth.gov.in/medi_edu/post_graduate.htm
 www.pdumcrajkot.org

Medical colleges in Gujarat
Education in Rajkot
Memorials to Deendayal Upadhyay